Aurora was launched at Philadelphia in 1779. She did not appear in British registers until 1800. She then made five voyages as a slave ship in the triangular trade in enslaved people. She was damaged and condemned at Jamaica in 1807 after having landed her slaves from her fifth voyage.

Career
Aurora first appeared in Lloyd's Register (LR) in 1800 with A. Duncan, master, changing to A.Rose, changing to  Lawson. Her owner was A.Hughans. Her trade was Liverpool–Jamaica, changing to London–Africa. She had been almost rebuilt in 1797.

Captain Adam Rose acquired a letter of marque on 22 April 1800.

1st slave voyage (1800–1801): Captain George Lawson acquired a letter of marque on 26 November 1800. He sailed from London on 2 December 1800, bound for the Gold Coast. Aurora purchased her slaves at Cape Coast Castle and Anomabu. She arrived at Kingston, Jamaica, on 11 August 1801 and there landed 278 slaves. She left Kingston on 5 September, and arrived back at London on 1 November. At some point in the voyage Captain Thomas Ramsey had replaced Lawson.

2nd slave voyage (1802–1803): Captain Nathaniel McGhie sailed from London on 17 January 1802. Aurora embarked slaves on the Gold Coast. She arrived at Kingston on 17 December and landed 277 slaves. She left Kingston on 7 March 1803 and arrived at London on 8 May.

3rd slave voyage (1803–1804): Captain James Wilkinson acquired a letter of marque on 15 October 1803. Captain James Wilkins sailed from London on 15 November. Aurora started embarking slaves on 26 February 1804, first at Cape Coast Castle, and then at Accra. She arrived at Kingston on 28 June with 290 slaves. She arrived back at London on 11 October.

4th slave voyage (1805–1806): Captain James Phillips acquired a letter of marque on 14 March 1805. He sailed from London on 5 April. Aurora purchased her slaves on the Gold Coast and arrived at Demerara on 16 November. There she landed 280 slaves. She arrived back at London on 1 June 1806. On 23 March she was at the Long Island Channel at Crookhaven, having had to throw her guns and some of her cargo overboard during bad weather. From Long Island she sailed to Cork and then Rostock, before arriving back at England.

Lloyd's List reported in May 1805 that the French had burned Aurora, Phillips, master, at Dominica. The entry in the 1806 volume of Lloyd's Register for the Aurora of the present article carried the annotation "burnt". However, it is not clear which vessel the Aurora that was burnt was. The Aurora, Phillips, master, of London, of this article was on the coast of Africa when the other Aurora, Phillips, master, of London, was at Dominica.  

5th slave voyage (1806–1807): Captain John Finlay sailed from London on 14 July 1806. Lloyd's List reported in September that Aurora, Findlay, master, had put into Lisbon having lost her masts. She acquired slaves at Lagos, Onim, and at Accra. She arrived at Kingston on 31 July 1807.

Fate
On 26 November 1807 a gale upset Aurora, Finlay, master, while she was at Jamaica. She was condemned there.

Citations

1779 ships
Ships built in Philadelphia
Age of Sail merchant ships of England
London slave ships